The 97th Assembly District of Wisconsin is one of 99 districts in the Wisconsin State Assembly.  Located in southeastern Wisconsin, the district currently encompasses parts of central and western Waukesha County, including much of the city of Waukesha and the western half of the village of Waukesha, and the villages of Dousman and North Prairie. The seat is held by Republican Scott Allen since January 2015.

The 97th Assembly district is located within Wisconsin's 33rd Senate district, along with the 98th and 99th Assembly districts.

List of past representatives

References 

Wisconsin State Assembly districts
Waukesha County, Wisconsin